Landmark Books may refer to:

 Landmark Books (publisher)
 Landmark Books (series)
 Landmark Bookstores

See also
 Landmark Worldwide